A house mark was originally a mark of property, later also used as a family or clan emblem, incised on the facade of a building, on animals, in signet and similar in the farmer and burgher culture of Germany and Scandinavia.

These marks have the appearance of glyphs or runes consisting of a pattern of simple lines, without the application of colour.

Description 
The form of house marks is based on function. They should be easy to cut, scratch or engrave with a knife or similar tool. At the same time, they should be distinctive and easy to remember. House marks differ from the more complicated patterns of a coat of arms or flags, which include surfaces and solid colors.

House marks can be made from one or two lines and up to quite a complex pattern of line figures. Based on appearance, house marks resemble line figures in rock carvings and in early writing systems. It is unclear how extensively such ancient line figures were used as marks for people or property ownership.

The basic forms of a house mark is often runes, characters and numbers, stylized figures, international symbols like crosses, stars, and astrological or astronomical characters.

One characteristic of house marks is that they may consist of a basic form with addition or deduction of lines. In this way, related people can have marks that resemble each other, but differ by details. This is equivalent to cadency and adding brisures as a method to change a coat of arms.

Many house marks are placed in shield-shaped frames. We see this in seals, on buildings and on tombstones, for both farmers and city dwellers in Scandinavia and German areas, during the 1700s and 1800s. Some of these house mark shields also had color and approached the heraldic coat of arms.

History 
The use of house marks dates back to long before literacy was common. The purpose of a house mark is to have a recognisable mark that a person, a nuclear family, multiple generations of an extended family or an owner of a property can use to mark objects, cattle, or buildings for recognition of ownership.

Besides farmers, house marks have also been used by merchants, tradesman, artisans, and other town burghers on for example Bryggen in Bergen, on building blocks in the Nidaros Cathedral, and on personal seals in other Norwegian cities. There are also house marks written by hand on documents, for instance house marks of mining workers at Røros.

The Norwegian word  or  probably came from Denmark. There is no Norwegian reference before the 17th century. Both in Denmark and Sweden, the word  (with multiple spellings) is used since the 14th century and in the 16th century. In the Icelandic codes of law from the Middle Ages, one finds the word  used to denote owner marks used to tag animals. It is likely that this word has also been used in Norway.

In Finnish, the word  ("insignia") means a distinguishing mark or sign used by illiterate persons as a replacement of a written signature in official documents.

See also

References

Sources 

 Norwegian
 Sivert Aarflot: Om nogle af Hovedkaraktererne iblandt de saakaldte gamlævis Bumærkji, som ellers heder Runebogstaver, Norsk Landboeblad 1811
 H. J. Huitfeldt-Kaas, Oluf Kolsrud et al.: Norske Sigiller fra Middelalderen, Kristiania - Oslo 1899-1950
 Fredrik B. Wallem: En indledning til studiet af de nordiske bomærker, Årbok 1902 for Foreningen til Norske Fortidsminners Bevaring, Kristiania 1903
 Johan Koren Wiberg: Bomerker og Innflyttere vedkommende Kontoret i Bergen, Det Hanseatiske Museums Skrifter Nr 10, Bergen 1935
 Rikard Berge: «Bumerke», Vinje og Rauland, Stavanger 1940, pages 348-354
 L. Strømme: Bumerke frå Sunnmøre, Oslo 1943
 K. and Jon Haukanes: Segl og bumerke frå Hardanger, Oslo 1944
 Hans Krag: Norsk heraldisk mønstring fra Fredrik IV’s regjeringstid 1699-1730, bind II, Ålo 1955
 Hans Krag: Tømmermerker og bomerker, Heraldisk Tidsskrift 1/53, København 1960
 Hans Krag: Nogen norske seglmerker, Heraldisk Tidsskrift 1/157, København 1961
 Lars Kindem: Vossaboki 2, Voss 1933-38 (nytt opplag 1981)
 Jakob H. Vik: Bumerke frå Kvam i Hordaland, Hardanger Historielags tilleggskrift nr 13, Øystese 1962
 Kristian A. Bentsen: Merker og bumerker, Agder historielags årsskrift nr 46, Kristiansand S 1968
 Albert Joleik: Soga om Flora, Flora 1980, med bumerker tilrettelagt av Anders J. Moen
 Åsta Østmoe Kostveit: Kors i kake, skurd i tre. Tegn og symboler i folkekulturen, Oslo 1997
 Hans Cappelen: Bumerker i Norge (Oslo 2005)
 Hans Cappelen: «Bumerker i Norge - en oversikt», in Anders Bjønnes et al.: Segltegninger fra hyllingene i Norge 1591 og 1610, Oslo 2010

 Danish
 Allan Tønnesen: Helsingørs bomærker, København 1968
 Allan Tønnesen: Bomerker og runer, Heraldisk Tidsskrift 51/23, København 1985
 Allan Tønnesen (editor): Magtens besegling. Enevoldsarveregeringsakterne af 1661 og 1662 underskrevet og beseglet af stænderne i Danmark, Norge, Island og Færøerne, Syddansk Universitetsforlag, Odense 2013, 583 p., .

 Swedish
Tuve Skånberg: Glömda gudstecken. Från fornkyrklig dopliturgi till allmogens bomärken (2003) under Creative Commons BY-NC-ND 2.5 license

 German
 C. G. Homeyer: Die Haus- und Hofmarken, Berlin 1870
 H. Spruth: Die Hausmarke, Wesen und Bibliographie, Neustadt a.d.A. 1960

External links 

 Norwegian
 Bumerker (with multiple examples)
 Bumerker i Norge

Symbols
Heraldic charges
Visual motifs